Birmingham is an unincorporated community in Saskatchewan.  It is located along Highway 15 about 10 km (6 mi) northwest of Melville.

History
The community was an incorporated village from 1908 to 1918 and had a post office from 1908 to 1970. It was originally settled by people from England, but they either moved on or returned to England to fight the Great War. They were replaced largely by Ukrainians.

J. D. Strumbert suggested it be named after his home town, Birmingham, England.

References

See also

Former villages in Saskatchewan
Stanley No. 215, Saskatchewan
Unincorporated communities in Saskatchewan
Division No. 5, Saskatchewan